The 1993 Football League Cup Final took place on 18 April 1993 at Wembley Stadium, and was played between Arsenal and Sheffield Wednesday. Arsenal won 2–1 in normal time, in what was the first of three Wembley finals between the two sides that season; Arsenal and Wednesday also met in the FA Cup Final of that year (which went to a replay), the first time ever in English football.

The match was the first match in which any European clubs had used squad numbers and player names on their shirts. On this occasion, as in the FA Cup final and replay that year, players wore individual numbers which were retained for the FA Cup finals. Coincidentally, the first occurrence of players wearing numbered shirts came on 25 August 1928, when Arsenal and Chelsea wore numbered shirts in their matches against The Wednesday (renamed Sheffield Wednesday soon after) and Swansea Town, respectively.  Squad numbers became compulsory for Premier League clubs from August 1993.

In the game, Wednesday's John Harkes scored the opener in the 8th minute, before Paul Merson equalised for Arsenal. Merson then set up Steve Morrow for the winner. In the celebrations after the match, Arsenal skipper Tony Adams attempted to pick up Morrow and parade him on his shoulders, but Adams slipped and Morrow awkwardly hit the ground. He broke his arm and had to be rushed to hospital. Unable to receive his winner's medal on the day, he was eventually presented with it before the start of the FA Cup Final the following month.

Match details

Match rules:
90 minutes
30 minutes extra-time if necessary
Replay if scores still level
Two named substitutes, both of whom may be used

Road to Wembley

Arsenal
Round 2, 1st Leg: Millwall 1–1 Campbell at Highbury

Round 2, 2nd Leg: 1–1 Campbell at The Old Den (Arsenal win 3–1 on penalties)

Round 3: Derby County 1–1 Campbell at Baseball Ground

Round 3 Replay: 2–1 Campbell, Wright at Highbury

Round 4: Scarborough 1–0 Winterburn at McCain Stadium

Round 5: Nottingham Forest 2–0 Wright (2) at Highbury

Semi-final, 1st Leg: Crystal Palace 3–1 Smith (2), Wright at Selhurst Park

Semi-final, 2nd Leg: 2–0 Linighan, Wright at Highbury

Sheffield Wednesday
Round 2, 1st Leg: Hartlepool United 3–0 Bright, Watson, Wilson at Hillsborough Stadium

Round 2, 2nd Leg: 2–2 Bright, Warhurst at Victoria Park

Round 3: Leicester City 7–1 Bart-Williams, Bright (2), Hirst, Watson (2), Worthington at Hillsborough Stadium

Round 4: QPR 4–0 Bright, Hirst, Nilsson, Palmer at Hillsborough Stadium

Round 5: Ipswich Town 1–1 John Sheridan at Portman Road

Round 5 Replay 1–0 Warhurst at Hillsborough Stadium

Semi-final, 1st Leg: Blackburn Rovers 4–2 Harkes, John Sheridan, Warhurst (2) at Ewood Park

Semi-final, 2nd Leg: 2–1 Bright, Hirst at Hillsborough Stadium

References
 

EFL Cup Finals
League Cup Final 1993
League Cup Final 1993
1992–93 Football League
Football League Cup Final
1993 sports events in London